Krông Pắk  is a district (huyện) of Đắk Lắk province in the Central Highlands region of Vietnam.

As of 2003 the district had a population of 212,067. The district capital lies at Phước An.

References

Districts of Đắk Lắk province